Didelotia unifoliolata is a species of plant in the family Fabaceae. It is found in Cameroon, Democratic Republic of the Congo, Gabon, Ghana, possibly Ivory Coast, possibly Liberia, and possibly Sierra Leone. It is threatened by habitat loss.

References

Detarioideae
Flora of West Tropical Africa
Flora of Cameroon
Flora of the Democratic Republic of the Congo
Flora of Gabon
Flora of Ghana
Near threatened flora of Africa
Taxonomy articles created by Polbot